Birżebbuġa St. Peter's Football Club is a Maltese football club from the southern town of Birżebbuġa, which currently plays in the Maltese National Amateur League. They are the only football team from the town of Birżebbuġa. They are known for producing young players from their Youth Nursery, which is called Birżebbuġa Windmills Youth Nursery. This club also fields a Futsal team, under the name of Birżebbuġa St. Peter's F.C. Futsal.

Players

Current squad

Honours
 BOV Third Division: 1953–54, 1997–98, 2005–06

References

External links
 Official website

Football clubs in Malta
1946 establishments in Malta
Birżebbuġa
Association football clubs established in 1946